Gimnástico Fútbol Club is a team that united with Levante FC to become Union Deportiva Levante-Gimnástico with current name of Levante Union Deportiva football club based in Valencia, Spain.  Historically backed, Levante Union Deportiva is the most senior football club in Valencia. Levante UD having origin from 1909 from both teams that formed its sports union: Levante Football Club and Gimnástico Football Club.  As a matter of fact, Levante UD took their nickname, the Frogs, "Granota" in Valencian, from their Gimnástic FC heritage.

History
Gimnástico F.C. was founded in 1909. In 1939 Levante FC and Gimnástico united to become current team Levante UD.

In 1980, a club called Gimnástico CF was founded to bring back the history of Gimnástico. In 2002, the club was sold to Valencia CF and became their C-team, before being dissolved in 2004. Gimnástico returned to an independent status in 2003, but as a football school, after incorporating Tiris CF; the club was later incorporated into CD Malilla's structure in 2006.

Background
Levante FC - (1909–1939) → ↓
UD Levante-Gimnástico (renamed Levante UD) - (1939–Present)
Gimnástico FC - (1909–1939) → ↑

Seasons

 2 seasons in Segunda División
 5 seasons in Tercera División
12 seasons in Regional League

References

External links 
 Levante UD Official website 
 Regional Titles at RSSSF
 Copa de España Libre, at RSSSF

 
Association football clubs established in 1913
Association football clubs disestablished in 1939
Defunct football clubs in the Valencian Community
1913 establishments in Spain
1939 disestablishments in Spain
Segunda División clubs